Folleville is a commune in the Somme department in Hauts-de-France in northern France.

Geography

Population

Places of interest
 Chateau de Folleville (14th century)
 Church of Saint-Jacques-Le-Majeur et Saint-Jean-Baptiste

See also
Communes of the Somme department

References

Bibliography
 Pierre Michelin, Folleville. La fin du Moyen Âge et les premières formes de la modernité (1519–1617), préface de Jean Estienne, Amiens : Mémoires de la Société des Antiquaires de Picardie - tome 56, 2000, 398 p. 
 Georges Durand, "Les Lannoy, Folleville et l'art italien dans le Nord de la France", in Eugène Lefèbvre-Pontalis (dir.), Le Bulletin Monumental, tome 70, 1906.

External links

 Folleville official website

Communes of Somme (department)
World Heritage Sites in France